Series may refer to:

People with the name
 Caroline Series (born 1951), English mathematician, daughter of George Series
 George Series (1920–1995), English physicist

Arts, entertainment, and media

Music

 Series, the ordered sets used in serialism including tone rows
 Harmonic series (music)
 Serialism, including the twelve-tone technique

Types of series in arts, entertainment, and media
 Anime series
 Book series
 Comic book series
 Film series 
 Manga series
 Podcast series
 Radio series
 Television series
 "Television series", the Australian, British, and a number of others countries' equivalent term for the North American "television season", a set of episodes produced by a television serial 
 Video game series
 Web series

Mathematics and science
 Series (botany), a taxonomic rank between genus and species
 Series (mathematics), the sum of a sequence of terms
 Series (stratigraphy), a stratigraphic unit deposited during a certain interval of geologic time
 Series, a level of provenance in archival science
 Seriation (archaeology), a method of dating objects
 Seriation (semiotics), a concept in interpreting phenomena
 Series circuits, a kind of electrical network

Other uses
 Series (United States currency), referring to the year that a bill's design was adopted
 Series, a sequence of competitive sports events, sometimes to decide a championship
 Land Rover Series, early Land Rover workhorses (forerunners to the Defender)

See also
 1 series (disambiguation)
 3 series
 5 series
 7 series (disambiguation)
 A series (disambiguation)
 B series (disambiguation)
 C series (disambiguation)
 D series (disambiguation)
 E series (disambiguation)
 F series (disambiguation)
 G series (disambiguation)
 H series (disambiguation)
 I series (disambiguation)
 J series (disambiguation)
 K series (disambiguation)
 L series (disambiguation)
 M series (disambiguation)
 N series (disambiguation)
 O series (disambiguation)
 P series (disambiguation)
 Q series (disambiguation)
 R series (disambiguation)
 S series (disambiguation)
 T series (disambiguation)
 U series (disambiguation)
 V series (disambiguation)
 W series (disambiguation)
 X series (disambiguation)
 Y series (disambiguation)
 Z series (disambiguation)
 0 series (disambiguation)
 Serial (literature)
 Serial (radio and television)
 Serie A (disambiguation)
 Serie A2 (disambiguation)
 Serie B (disambiguation)
 Serie C
 Serie D
 Series A
 Series B
 World Series (disambiguation)